Crispin "Ping" Chupungco Medina Jr. (born July 23, 1983) is a Filipino film actor. Medina is a contract artist of Star Magic.

Career
Medina is a prominent independent film actor in the Philippines. He debuted in Marilou Diaz-Abaya's film Jose Rizal with his father, Pen Medina playing as the young Paciano Rizal.

In 2012, Medina was chosen as the host of CNN's travel show CNNGo along with his co-host Nikki Gil.

In late November 2016, Medina became involved in an altercation with fellow actor Baron Geisler. Medina released a lengthy Facebook post with a photo of himself, sitting on a wheelchair and his middle finger aloft using his broken hand wrapped in bandages as a gesture of contempt against Geisler in the wake of the incident. According to his post, Geisler urinated on him during a shoot of an independent film in Subic wherein Medina's hands and feet were tied and his mouth was taped in a certain scene. Geisler issued an apology about the incident later on, admitting that he had been drinking and was heavily medicated with anti-depressants while filming. The same day, the film's director, Arlyn Dela Cruz, confirmed on her Facebook account that Geisler's role had been "written out" for the incident; she disclosed that some actors initially advised her not to work with Geisler, due to his "unruly behavior". In December 2016, Dela Cruz also confirmed that she would be replacing Medina with an unnamed actor in hopes that she could bring back the "happy atmosphere" on the set of her film. In 2020, Geisler stated in a Twitter response that Medina raped a former girlfriend of his citing it as the reason he urinated on him after rape allegations against Medina surfaced from a certain Twitter user in the same year. Geisler had previously accused Medina with the same allegations back in 2016 after the incident between them. Medina since has not provided concrete response to Geisler's accusations.

Filmography

Television

Movies

References

External links

Living people
Filipino people of Kapampangan descent
Filipino male television actors
Star Magic
ABS-CBN personalities
GMA Network personalities
Filipino male film actors
Tagalog people
Male actors from Metro Manila
People from Pasig
1983 births